Marcus & Co. was an American luxury jewelry retailer from 1892 to 1962 in New York City.

History
Marcus & Company, founded by William Elder Marcus and later joined by George Marcus and their father, Herman, a German-born former employee of Tiffany & Co., began as a partnership with George B. Jaques as Jaques & Marcus. The business changed its name to Marcus & Co. with the retirement of Jaques in 1892.

It was located at 17th Street and Broadway in Manhattan.

The designers used gemstones such as zircons, chrysoberyls, tourmalines, opals, garnets, beryls, spinels, and peridots. French miniature portraitist Fernand Paillet designed a pendant for them.

The company was sold to Gimbels in 1941. It merged with Black, Starr & Frost in 1962.

References

1892 establishments in New York (state)
1962 disestablishments in New York (state)
Shops in New York City
Companies based in Manhattan